Sayed Shubbar Ebrahim Alawi Hashem (born 11 August 1985) is a football player who plays for Al Khaldiya and Bahrain national football team as a goalkeeper.

International career
Alawi made his senior international debut on 23 March 2009 in a 5–2 friendly victory over Zimbabwe. In December 2018, Alawi was included in Bahrain's squad for the 2019 AFC Asian Cup.

References

External links
 Sayed Shubbar Alawi at the National-Football-Teams
 Sayed Shubbar Alawi at the Bahrain Football Association

1985 births
Living people
Bahraini footballers
Bahrain international footballers
Association football goalkeepers
Saham SC players
Riffa SC players
Al-Najma SC (Bahrain) players
2019 AFC Asian Cup players